Miró's Chicago  (originally called The Sun, the Moon and One Star) is a sculpture by Joan Miró.

History
In 1969 the Brunswick Corporation commissioned a design from Miró for this sculpture, but they decided not to proceed due to the costs. This bronze model of Miró's Chicago (pictured below) is in the Milwaukee Art Museum collection. In 1979 the first female Mayor of Chicago, Jane Byrne, agreed to find funds for the sculpture assuming that another 50% could be found elsewhere. After the commitment of several institutions, foundations and individuals, construction began with Miró reducing the cost by donating his design to the city and the names of the contributors included in the specification. The City of Chicago contributed $250,000 and the majority funding came from the other donors.

Location
It is located between the Cook County Administration Building and the Chicago Temple Building in the downtown Loop community area of Chicago, Illinois.  This location is directly to the south of the Daley Center, and nearly directly south of the Chicago Picasso.  The sculpture was unveiled in this space, called Brunswick Plaza, on April 21, 1981.

See also
 List of public art in Chicago

References

Chicago
1981 sculptures
Outdoor sculptures in Chicago
Central Chicago
Abstract sculptures in Illinois
Bronze sculptures in Illinois
Modernist sculpture
Sculptures of women in Illinois
Brunswick Corporation
Moon in art